Tuen Mun South is the future western terminus of MTR's . It is to be constructed elevated across Wu King Road and Wu Chui Road in Tuen Mun, Hong Kong. The construction of the station is gazetted as part of the Tuen Mun South extension by the Hong Kong Government in January 2022. The station is expected to open for service in 2030.

Station layout 
The station will have a bay platform built elevated above Wu King Road. It will have two separate concourses, the northern concourse around the current-day Wu King Road Garden, and the southern above the current-day Tuen Mun Public Pier public toilets.

History 

The environmental impact assessment was approved on July 2022.

References 

Tuen Mun
Proposed railway stations in Hong Kong
MTR stations in the New Territories